LWP may refer to:

 LAN WorkPlace, a former TCP/IP-based network client product by Excelan and Novell
 Library for WWW in Perl, a networking library for Perl
 Life without parole
 Light-weight process
 Live Wallpaper
 Lotus Word Pro
 Polish People's Army, the armed force of the People's Republic of Poland